Robert A. Boyd  (June 21, 1918 – November 6, 2006) was a Canadian electric engineer and utility executive. He successfully led the construction of the first phase of the James Bay hydroelectric project, a large dam complex built in northern Quebec by Hydro-Québec during the 1970s and early 1980s.

Early life and family
Born in Sherbrooke, Quebec in a working-class family to a Scot-Irish father and a French Canadian mother. Boyd graduated from École Polytechnique de Montréal in 1943.

Career
Soon after finished school, Boyd joined the ranks of the newly created provincially owned utility Hydro-Québec, as the first French-speaking engineer ever hired by the company. He spent his 37-year career in different positions, reaching the top job in 1977.

Boyd took over as president of Hydro-Québec on August 9, 1977, after the departure of financier Roland Giroux. During his 4-year tenure as president of the Crown Corporation, Boyd secured large bond issues with international banks to finish the construction project. On October 27, 1979, Boyd inaugurated, with Premier René Lévesque, the LG-2 generating station, a massive 5,616 MW underground powerhouse buried deep in the Canadian Shield.

Construction on Phase I of the James Bay Project was completed in 1984, when La Grande-3 and La Grande-4 generating stations came on-line further upstream.

Honors and awards
In 1978, he received an honorary doctorate from Concordia University. Boyd was selected Construction's Man of the Year in 1981 by the Engineering News-Record for his work on the James Bay project.

See also
 Hydro-Québec
 James Bay Energy
 Churchill Falls

References

Canadian electrical engineers
Officers of the Order of Canada
Officers of the National Order of Quebec
James Bay Project
Hydro-Québec
1918 births
2006 deaths
Quebec civil servants
Canadian chief executives
People from Sherbrooke